is a railway station on the Tadami Line in the town of Kaneyama, Ōnuma District, Fukushima Prefecture, Japan, operated by East Japan Railway Company (JR East).

Lines

Station layout
Aizu-Mizunuma Station has one side platform serving a single bi-directional track. There is no station building, but only a small shelter on the platform. The station is unattended.

History
The station was absorbed into the JR East network upon the privatization of the JNR on April 1, 1987.

Surrounding area
Aizu-Mizunuma Station is located in an isolated rural location with no buildings nearby.
Tadami River

See also
 List of railway stations in Japan

References

External links

 JR East Station information 

Railway stations in Fukushima Prefecture
Tadami Line
Railway stations in Japan opened in 1956
Stations of East Japan Railway Company
Kaneyama, Fukushima